Marcus Knight FKC (11 September 1903 – 11 December 1988) was an Anglican priest. He was the Dean of Exeter in the Church of England from 1960 to 1972.

Knight was educated at Christ's Hospital and King's College London .  After  curacies in Stoke Newington and Ealing he was  the Priest-Vicar of Exeter Cathedral. After this he was the Vicar of Cockington and then Rural Dean of Atherstone. He was a canon of St Paul's Cathedral, London from 1946 to 1960 when he was appointed as the Dean of Exeter.  He was awarded an honorary doctorate by Exeter University.

References

1903 births
People educated at Christ's Hospital
Alumni of King's College London
Fellows of King's College London
Deans of Exeter
1988 deaths